An overview of the films produced by the Bollywood film industry based in Mumbai in 1952. Dilip Kumar went on to win the first Filmfare Best Actor Award in 1954 for his performance in Daag. Meena Kumari went on to win the first Filmfare Best Actress Award for her role in Baiju Bawra.

Highest-grossing films
The ten highest-grossing films at the Indian Box Office in 1952:

A-B

C-J

K-R

S-Z

References

External links
 Bollywood films of 1952 at the Internet Movie Database
 Indian Film Songs from the Year 1952 - A review of the year 1951 with a special focus on Hindi film songs

1952
Bollywood
Films, Bollywood